Hatley Park is a neighbourhood in Colwood, British Columbia. Named after Hatley Park National Historic Site, it is the home of Royal Roads University. Another notable landmark in the area is the Hatley Memorial Gardens, a large cemetery located opposite Hatley Park National Historic Site.

While some farmland remains in the area, most has been converted to middle-class residential subdivisions and commercial establishments (mainly strip malls). The neighbourhood's major thoroughfare is Highway 14, locally known as Sooke Road.

Hatley Castle has been used as a filming location in all three X-Men movies for both interior and exterior shots. 

Populated places in the Capital Regional District